Kalanjoor  is a village located in Pathanamthitta district state of Kerala, India. The place is 22 km away from district headquarters. As a part of  Konni assembly constituency and Pathanamthitta (Lok Sabha constituency). Kalanjoor is also a panchayath where share the border of Kollam and Pathanamthitta Dist as the part of Parakode block panchayath. This place has mixed with a population of Hindus, Muslims and Christians. The famous Hindu temple "Thrikalanjoor Sree Mahadeva Temple" situated in Kalanjoor Town close to Punalur Muvattupuzha Main Eastern Highway (SH 08). This is one of the biggest Shiva temple in Pathanamthitta district and the first Sabarimala edathavalam on the way of Sabarimala from the Southern part of Pathanamthitta dist. So that this place is also known as the "Southern Gateway of Sabarimala". One of the famous Christian Orthodox church St. George Valyapalli also situated in the same village and one of the India's largest aqueduct is also passing through Kalanjoor as part of Kallada Irrigation Project (KIP). Many of the inhabitants of this village are settlers there due to the introduction of rubber plantations. A number of people from Kalanjoor are employed in abroad, mainly in the Middle East.

College of Applied Science, Kalanjoor is affiliated to Kerala University and is established in 2014 with regular courses of  B.Com with Computer Applications and Bachelor of Business Administration (BBA).

.

Demographics
 India census, Kalanjoor had a population of 15604 with 7499 males and 8105 females.

Educational Institutions

College

 College of Applied Sciences (I.H.R.D), Kalanjoor

Schools

 GVHSS & GHSS Kalanjoor
 Govt. LP School Kalanjoor
 Vyasa Vidya Peethom Kalanjoor

Places To Visit

Trikalanjoor Mahadeva Temple

This one of the famous Hindu Temple in Pathanamthitta situated in Kalanjoor junction.  

  

Kudappara, Kalanjoor

Kudappara is Small Hindu Temple situated on the top of small hill. This place is historical as well as good for sightseeing during morning and evening. Place is located in Kalanjoor - Padom road, 800m from Kalanajoor Jn

Kochu Kuttalam Waterfalls

This beautiful and small seasonal waterfall, is located in Vazhapara, Kalanjoor - Padom road 2km from Kalanjoor jn

See also
Kuttimannilbethel

References

Villages in Pathanamthitta district